TheBacklot.com (TheBacklot), founded in January 2005 as AfterElton (AfterElton.com), was a culture website that focused on the portrayal of gay and bisexual men in the media, and was the companion site of the lesbian-focused AfterEllen (AfterEllen.com). TheBacklot was dissolved in June 2015, and its content was merged with the website NewNowNext, owned by Logo TV.

History
TheBacklot was originally known under the name AfterElton and was founded by Sarah Warn, Michael Jensen, and Brent Hartinger. Warn initially served as Editor in Chief of both AfterElton and AfterEllen. Jensen became Editor in Chief of AfterElton in November 2005 and served in the position until September 25, 2011. Dennis Ayers, formerly the site's managing editor, took over as Editor in Chief.

The site was not affiliated with Elton John, although its original name refers to the milestone for gay men when John publicly came out. The site featured television, film, music, books, and celebrity news. It published articles, regular columns, reviews, recaps of television shows with gay and bisexual characters, and maintained several blogs, including the "Meme" by Ed Kennedy.

AfterElton (along with AfterEllen) was acquired by cable television channel Logo in 2006. On January 12, 2012, the site announced that Louis Virtel had been hired as its West Coast entertainment editor. On January 31, 2013, Dennis Ayers announced that AfterElton would be changing its name to TheBacklot.com in April. The change was motivated by a desire to separate the website from its "AfterEllen's little brother" origin and to reflect the general "focus on Hollywood and the film and television industry". The relaunch under the new name took place on April 17, 2013.

On June 29, 2015, Ayers announced that the TheBacklot was merging with NewNowNext, an LGBT-themed entertainment website owned by Logo. TheBacklot name was discontinued and Dan Avery became Editor-in-Chief of the combined site.

Hot 100
The "Hot 100" was an annual readers poll, begun in 2007, of the "top names in film, television, music, sports and fashion".

References

Internet properties established in 2005
2006 mergers and acquisitions
Internet properties disestablished in 2015
2000s LGBT-related mass media
2010s LGBT-related mass media
Defunct American websites
Gay men's websites
Gay culture in the United States
LGBT-related mass media in the United States